Sol Tax (30 October 1907 – 4 January 1995) was an American anthropologist.  He is best known for creating action anthropology and his studies of the Meskwaki, or Fox, Indians, for "action-anthropological" research titled the Fox Project, and for founding the academic journal Current Anthropology. He received his doctorate from the University of Chicago in 1935 and, together with Fred Eggan, was a student of Alfred Radcliffe-Brown.

Early life
Tax grew up in Milwaukee, Wisconsin. During his formative years he was involved in a number of social clubs. Among these was the Newsboys Republic with which his first encounter was when he was "arrested" for breaking their rules. Tax began his undergraduate education at the University of Chicago but had to leave for lack of funds.  He returned to school at the University of Wisconsin–Madison, where he studied with Ralph Linton.  He later earned a doctorate at the University of Chicago in 1935. He joined the faculty of that institution in 1940 where he spent several decades teaching. Tax was a mentor to noted anthropologist Joan Ablon at the University of Chicago.

Career
He was the main organizer for the 1959 Darwin Centennial Celebration held at the University of Chicago. He was an organizer, along with the National Congress of American Indians, including Native American organizer Willard LaMere, of the 1961 American Indian Chicago Conference. He assisted in authoring the resulting Statement of Indian Purpose, the first major statement of the policy of tribal self-determination.

Honors
The American Anthropological Association presented to him and Bela Maday its Franz Boas award for exemplary service to anthropology in 1977. He was the association's president in 1959.

Action Anthropology
 
Sol Tax is known as a founder of "Action Anthropology", a school of anthropological thought that forwent the traditional doctrine of non-interference in favor of co-equal goals of "learning and helping" from studied cultures. As an example, he was a lead organizer of the influential 1961 American Indian Chicago Conference (AICC). The meeting brought together 460 American Indians from 90 tribes from June 13 to June 20, 1961 at the University of Chicago to help "all Indians of the whole nation to express their own views" and draft a shared "Declaration of Indian Purpose." President John F. Kennedy received the declaration in a ceremony at the White House in 1962. The spirit of self-determination expressed in the document became a cornerstone of Native activism in the years that followed, including the Red Power movement and the expansion of Native American gaming.

When in 1974, the Chicago Native American Committee established the Native American Educational Services College, (NAES College) Tax served on the original Academic Review Committee. As the college grew, the Academic Review Committee was converted into a Board of Directors in 1978. Tax accepted an invitation to join, and he served on the committee until 1993, not long before his death. NAES credited Tax with playing a "key role in helping define a vision of Indian higher education as the basis for community development in culturally relevant terms." Tax's particular contribution was the core idea of field projects in the NAES curriculum.

Works
(1937, revised 1955) contributions to Social Anthropology of North American Tribes, ed. by Fred Eggan. Chicago: University of Chicago Press.
 [http://www.transactionpub.com/title/Doing-Fieldwork-978-0-7658-0735-9.htmlRubinstein, Robert A., ed. 2001. Doing Fieldwork: The Correspondence of Robert Redfield and Sol Tax, New Brunswick, NJ: Transaction Books.]
(1953, revised 1972) Penny Capitalism; a Guatemalan Indian economy'' . Tax is said to have coined the term 'Penny capitalism'.
(1988) Pride and Puzzlement: A Retro-introspective Record of 60 Years of Anthropology Annual Review of Anthropology

See also
 Bronislaw Malinowski Award
 Sol Tax Distinguished Service Award

References

External links
 Sol Tax - Fort Berthold Action Anthropology Project, National Anthropological Archives, Smithsonian Institution
 Sol Tax - Fox field notes and Fox Project records 1932–1959, National Anthropological Archives, Smithsonian Institution
 Obituary: Sol Tax, Anthropology
 Tax, Sol. 1963. Penny Capitalism: A Guatemalan Indian Economy. The University of Chicago Press.
Guide to the Sol Tax Papers 1923-1989 at the University of Chicago Special Collections Research Center
Guide to the Native American Educational Services Sol Tax Papers 1908-1993 at the University of Chicago Special Collections Research Center

1907 births
1995 deaths
Scientists from Milwaukee
Presidents of the American Anthropological Association
University of Chicago faculty
University of Chicago alumni
University of Wisconsin–Madison alumni
Writers from Chicago
Writers from Milwaukee
20th-century American anthropologists
American Anthropologist editors